Sohbatpur District is a district in the Pakistani province of Balochistan. 

It was created in May 2013 from parts of Jafarabad District.

The district has a population of over 200‚000.

Administration

Sohbatpur District consists of the following Tehsils:
 Manjhipur;
 Hairdin;
 Faridabad; and
 Sohbatpur.
The district borders the Naseerabad, Jaffarabad and Dera Bugti districts in Balochistan, and Jacobabad and Kashmore districts in Sindh.

The district has eight police stations.

Demographics

At the time of the 2017 census the district had a population of 200,426, of which 102,967 were males and 97,449 females. 12,867 (6.42%) lived in urban areas. The literacy rate was 33.15% - the male literacy rate was 47.65% while the female literacy rate was 18.07%. Islam was the predominant religion with 99.26%, while Hindus are 0.68% of the population.

At the time of the 2017 census, 76.33% of the population spoke Balochi, 12.55% Sindhi, 6.75% Brahui and 3.52% Saraiki as their first language.

References 

 
Districts of Pakistan
Districts of Balochistan, Pakistan